St. Peter's Episcopal Church is a historic Episcopal church building at 31 Throckmorton Street in Freehold Borough, Monmouth County, New Jersey, United States.

The building was constructed in 1771 and features Georgian and Gothic Revival elements. The church was added to the National Register of Historic Places in 1998.

References

External links

Official church website

18th-century Episcopal church buildings
Churches in Monmouth County, New Jersey
Episcopal church buildings in New Jersey
Freehold Borough, New Jersey
Georgian architecture in New Jersey
Gothic Revival church buildings in New Jersey
National Register of Historic Places in Monmouth County, New Jersey
New Jersey Register of Historic Places
Churches on the National Register of Historic Places in New Jersey
Churches completed in 1771